Michael or Mike Logan may refer to:

 Michael Logan (journalist), American magazine columnist
 Michael Logan (author), screenwriter for the film Some Like It Hot
 Michael Logan (bassist) (born 1948), American jazz bassist
Mike Logan (American football) (born 1974), player for the Pittsburgh Steelers
Mike Logan (Law & Order), fictional character from the television series Law & Order and Law & Order: Criminal Intent

See also
 Logan (surname)